From 2016, the 25-member unicameral Australian Capital Territory Legislative Assembly is elected from five multi-member electorates, with five seats per electorate.

History

Electorate boundaries for Australian Capital Territory Legislative Assembly elections have changed a number of times since the first ACT election in 1989. For the 1989 and 1992 elections, the ACT comprised one electorate, electing seventeen members to the Assembly. Prior to the 1995 ACT general election, three multi-member electorates were established and have remained in place, with boundary and redistribution changes made prior to the 2001 and 2008 ACT general elections.

On 30 April 2002, the ACT Electoral Commission made a submission to the ACT Legislative Assembly's Standing Committee on Legal Affairs, which inquired into the appropriateness of the size of the Legislative Assembly for the ACT and options for changing the number of members, electorates and other related matters. The Electoral Commission recommended increasing "the size of the Legislative Assembly to three (3) electorates each returning seven (7) Members, giving a total of twenty-one (21) Members". The Assembly has not made any changes to either its size (number of members) or the number of electorates.

Electorates

Current electorates
This is a list of electorates for the 2016 ACT general election:

Brindabella

Electing five members to the Assembly, Brindabella contains the town centre and all of the suburbs of Tuggeranong excluding Kambah. It also includes all of the ACT which is south of the Murrumbidgee River, thus making it the largest electorate by area.

Ginninderra

Electing five members to the Assembly, Ginninderra contains the town centre and all of the suburbs of Belconnen excluding Evatt, Giralang, Kaleen, Lawson and McKellar. Its southern boundary was the Molonglo River prior to the 2016 election.

Kurrajong

Electing five members to the Assembly, Kurrajong contains all the suburbs of Inner North Canberra, Inner South Canberra and Oaks Estate.

Murrumbidgee

Electing five members to the Assembly, Murrumbidgee contains all the suburbs of the Molonglo Valley, Weston Creek, Woden Valley and the Tuggeranong suburb of Kambah.

Yerrabi

Electing five members to the Assembly, Yerrabi contains all the suburbs of Gungahlin as well as the Belconnen suburbs of Evatt, Giralang, Kaleen, Lawson and McKellar and the village of Hall.

Former electorates
These electorates no longer exist:

Molonglo

Molonglo was an electorate of the Australian Capital Territory Legislative Assembly that was contested from the 1995 election to the 2012 election, it covered Inner North Canberra, Inner South Canberra, Weston Creek and  most of the suburbs of Woden and Gungahlin. It was a 7-seat electorate.

See also
 Electoral systems of the Australian states and territories
 Members of the Australian Capital Territory Legislative Assembly
 Australian Capital Territory ministries

References